Empress was a provincial electoral district in Alberta, Canada, mandated to return a single member to the Legislative Assembly of Alberta from 1926 to 1940.

History
The Empress electoral district was created prior to the 1926 Alberta general election, constituting the boundaries of the former Redcliff electoral district.

The electoral district was named for the Village of Empress, Alberta.

The Empress electoral district merged with Bow Valley in the 1939 boundary redistribution to form Bow Valley-Empress.

Members of the Legislative Assembly (MLAs)

Election results

1926 general election

1930 general election

1935 general election

See also
List of Alberta provincial electoral districts
Empress, Alberta, a village in southwest Alberta

References

Further reading

External links
Elections Alberta
The Legislative Assembly of Alberta

Former provincial electoral districts of Alberta